Chaima Abbassi (born 4 June 1993) is a Tunisian footballer who plays as a centre back for AS Banque de l'Habitat and captains the Tunisia women's national team.

Club career
Abbassi has played for AS Banque de l'Habitat in Tunisia.

International career
Abbassi has capped for Tunisia at senior level, including two friendly away wins over Jordan in June 2021.

See also
List of Tunisia women's international footballers

References

External links

1993 births
Living people
People from Ben Arous Governorate
Tunisian women's footballers
Women's association football central defenders
Tunisia women's international footballers
Saudi Women's Premier League players